Madhouse may refer to:

 Madhouse, a colloquial term for a psychiatric hospital
 Madhouse, the nickname given to the double-1 in darts

Books 
 Archie's Mad House, a comic book series published by Archie Comics
 Madhouse: A Tragic Tale of Megalomania and Modern Medicine, a 2005 book
 Madhouse (novel), by Rob Thurman
 Madhouse (magazine), Argentine heavy metal magazine

Film 
 Madhouse (1974 film), a 1974 film featuring Vincent Price
 Madhouse (1981 film), a 1981 Italian horror film
 Madhouse (1990 film), a 1990 film starring Kirstie Alley and John Larroquette
 Madhouse (2004 film), a 2004 film starring Joshua Leonard

Music 
 Madhouse Records, a record label
 Madhouse (band), an American band that was a side project for Prince
 Madhouse, a Romanian band featuring Ovidiu Lipan
 Madhouse, an American gothic rock band by Monica Richards
 Mad'House, a French house music project group that did cover songs of Madonna

Albums 
 Madhouse: The Very Best of Anthrax, an album by Anthrax
 Madhouse (Silver Convention album), a 1976 album by Silver Convention

Songs 
 "Madhouse" (song), by the thrash metal band Anthrax
 "Mad House", song from Rihanna's 2009 album Rated R
 "Madhouse", a song from Little Mix's album DNA

Television 
 Madhouse, a 1980–1985 British TV comedy series starring Russ Abbot
 MadHouse (TV series), a television series about weekly racing at Bowman Gray Stadium

Other uses 
 The Madhouse, an 1819 painting by Francisco de Goya
 Madhouse (ride), a type of theme park attraction manufactured by Vekoma
 Madhouse (company), a Japanese animation studio
 Bowman Gray Stadium's nickname

See also 
 Madhouse on Madison (disambiguation)